The turkey is a large bird in the genus Meleagris, native to North America. There are two extant turkey species: the wild turkey (Meleagris gallopavo) of eastern and central North America and the ocellated turkey (Meleagris ocellata) of the Yucatán Peninsula in Mexico. Males of both turkey species have a distinctive fleshy wattle, called a snood, that hangs from the top of the beak. They are among the largest birds in their ranges. As with many large ground-feeding birds (order Galliformes), the male is bigger and much more colorful than the female.

Native to North America, the wild species was bred as domesticated turkey by indigenous peoples.  It was this domesticated turkey that later reached Eurasia, during the Columbian exchange.  In English, "turkey" probably got its name from the domesticated variety being imported to Britain in ships coming from the Turkish Levant via Spain. The British at the time therefore associated the bird with the country Turkey and the name prevailed. An alternative theory posits that another bird, a guinea fowl native to Madagascar introduced to England by Turkish merchants, was the original source, and that the term was then transferred to the New World bird by English colonizers with knowledge of the previous species.

The earliest turkeys evolved in North America over 20 million years ago.  They share a recent common ancestor with grouse, pheasants, and other fowl. The wild turkey species is the ancestor of the domestic turkey, which was domesticated approximately 2,000 years ago.

Taxonomy
The genus Meleagris was introduced in 1758 by the Swedish naturalist Carl Linnaeus in the tenth edition of his Systema Naturae. The genus name is from the Ancient Greek μελεαγρις, meleagris meaning "guineafowl". The type species is the wild turkey (Meleagris gallopavo).

Turkeys are classed in the family Phasianidae (pheasants, partridges, francolins, junglefowl, grouse, and relatives thereof) in the taxonomic order Galliformes. They are close relatives of the grouse and are classified alongside them in the tribe Tetraonini.

Extant species
The genus contains two species.

Fossil species
 Meleagris californica Californian turkey – Southern California
 Meleagris crassipes Southwestern turkey - New Mexico

Names

The linguist Mario Pei proposes two possible explanations for the name turkey. One theory suggests that when Europeans first encountered turkeys in the Americas, they incorrectly identified the birds as a type of guineafowl, which were already being imported into Europe by English merchants to the Levant via Constantinople. The birds were therefore nicknamed turkey coqs. The name of the North American bird may have then become turkey fowl or Indian turkeys, which was eventually shortened to turkeys.

A second theory arises from turkeys coming to England not directly from the Americas, but via merchant ships from the Middle East, where they were domesticated successfully. Again the importers lent the name to the bird; hence turkey-cocks and turkey-hens, and soon thereafter, turkeys.

In 1550, the English navigator William Strickland, who had introduced the turkey into England, was granted a coat of arms including a "turkey-cock in his pride proper". William Shakespeare used the term in Twelfth Night, believed to be written in 1601 or 1602. The lack of context around his usage suggests that the term was already widespread.

These are thought to arise from the supposed belief of Christopher Columbus that he had reached India rather than the Americas on his voyage.

Several other birds that are sometimes called turkeys are not particularly closely related: the brushturkeys are megapodes, and the bird sometimes known as the Australian turkey is the Australian bustard (Ardeotis australis). The anhinga (Anhinga anhinga) is sometimes called the water turkey, from the shape of its tail when the feathers are fully spread for drying.

An infant turkey is called a chick or poult.

History

Turkeys were likely first domesticated in Pre-Columbian Mexico, where they held a cultural and symbolic importance. The Classical Nahuatl word for the turkey,  ( in Spanish), is still used in modern Mexico, in addition to the general term . Mayan aristocrats and priests appear to have had a special connection to ocellated turkeys, with ideograms of those birds appearing in Mayan manuscripts. Spanish chroniclers, including Bernal Díaz del Castillo and Father Bernardino de Sahagún, describe the multitude of food (both raw fruits and vegetables as well as prepared dishes) that were offered in the vast markets of Tenochtitlán, noting there were tamales made of turkeys, iguanas, chocolate, vegetables, fruits and more.

Turkeys were first exported to Europe via Spain around 1519, where they gained immediate popularity among the aristocratic classes. Turkeys arrived in England in 1541. From there, English settlers brought turkeys to North America during the 17th century.

Destruction and re-introduction in the United States 
In what is now the United States, there were an estimated 10 million turkeys in the 17th century.  By the 1930s, only 30,000 remained.  In the 1960s and 1970s, biologists started trapping wild turkeys from the few places they remained (including the Ozarks and New York), and re-introducing them into other states, including Minnesota and Vermont. Starting in 2014, researchers sent a survey to wildlife biologists in the National Wild Turkey Federation Technical Committee across the U.S. states to gather data regarding the population of turkeys. As of 2019, the wild turkey population declined by around 3% since 2014. Also as of 2019, the number of wild turkey hunters decreased by 18% since 2014 from the reports of the participating U.S. states. The 2019 data for population was missing information from 12 states and the 2019 hunter data was missing information from 8 states.

Human conflicts with wild turkeys
Turkeys have been known to be aggressive toward humans and pets in residential areas. Wild turkeys have a social structure and pecking order and habituated turkeys may respond to humans and animals as they do other turkeys. Habituated turkeys may attempt to dominate or attack people that the birds view as subordinates.

In 2017, the town of Brookline, Massachusetts, recommended a controversial approach when confronted with wild turkeys. Besides taking a step forward to intimidate the birds, officials also suggested "making noise (clanging pots or other objects together); popping open an umbrella; shouting and waving your arms; squirting them with a hose; allowing your leashed dog to bark at them; and forcefully fending them off with a broom". This advice was quickly rescinded and replaced with a caution that "being aggressive toward wild turkeys is not recommended by State wildlife officials.”

Fossil record
A number of turkeys have been described from fossils. The Meleagridinae are known from the Early Miocene ( mya) onwards, with the extinct genera Rhegminornis (Early Miocene of Bell, U.S.) and Proagriocharis (Kimball Late Miocene/Early Pliocene of Lime Creek, U.S.). The former is probably a basal turkey, the other a more contemporary bird not very similar to known turkeys; both were much smaller birds. A turkey fossil not assignable to genus but similar to Meleagris is known from the Late Miocene of Westmoreland County, Virginia. In the modern genus Meleagris, a considerable number of species have been described, as turkey fossils are robust and fairly often found, and turkeys show great variation among individuals. Many of these supposed fossilized species are now considered junior synonyms. One, the well-documented California turkey Meleagris californica, became extinct recently enough to have been hunted by early human settlers. It has been suggested that its demise was due to the combined pressures of human hunting and climate change at the end of the last glacial period.

The Oligocene fossil Meleagris antiquus was first described by Othniel Charles Marsh in 1871. It has since been reassigned to the genus Paracrax, first interpreted as a cracid, then soon after as a bathornithid Cariamiformes.

Fossil species
 Meleagris sp. (Early Pliocene of Bone Valley, U.S.)

 Meleagris sp. (Late Pliocene of Macasphalt Shell Pit, U.S.)

 Meleagris californica (Late Pleistocene of southwestern U.S.)formerly Parapavo/Pavo
 Meleagris crassipes (Late Pleistocene of southwestern North America)

Turkeys have been considered by many authorities to be their own family—the Meleagrididae—but a recent genomic analysis of a retrotransposon marker groups turkeys in the family Phasianidae. In 2010, a team of scientists published a draft sequence of the domestic turkey (Meleagris gallopavo) genome.

Anatomy

In anatomical terms, a snood is an erectile, fleshy protuberance on the forehead of turkeys. Most of the time when the turkey is in a relaxed state, the snood is pale and 2–3 cm long. However, when the male begins strutting (the courtship display), the snood engorges with blood, becomes redder and elongates several centimeters, hanging well below the beak (see image).

Snoods are just one of the caruncles (small, fleshy excrescences) that can be found on turkeys.

While fighting, commercial turkeys often peck and pull at the snood, causing damage and bleeding. This often leads to further injurious pecking by other turkeys and sometimes results in cannibalism. To prevent this, some farmers cut off the snood when the chick is young, a process known as "de-snooding".

Function
The snood functions in both intersexual and intrasexual selection. Captive female wild turkeys prefer to mate with long-snooded males, and during dyadic interactions, male turkeys defer to males with relatively longer snoods. These results were demonstrated using both live males and controlled artificial models of males. Data on the parasite burdens of free-living wild turkeys revealed a negative correlation between snood length and infection with intestinal coccidia, deleterious protozoan parasites. This indicates that in the wild, the long-snooded males preferred by females and avoided by males seemed to be resistant to coccidial infection. Scientists also conducted a study on 500 male turkeys, gathering data on their snood lengths and blood samples for immune system functionality. They discovered a similar negative correlation. The presence of more red blood cells when the snood is not removed will help to fight off unwanted invaders in their immune system, explaining this trend.

Behavior

Feeding 
Wild turkeys feed on various wildlife, depending on the season. In the warmer months of spring and summer, their diet consists mainly of grains such as wheat, corn, and of insects and smaller reptiles such as grasshoppers, spiders, worms, and, lizards. In the colder months of fall and winter, wild turkeys consume smaller fruits and nuts such as grapes, blueberries, acorns, and walnuts. To find this food, they have to continuously forage and feed most during the sunrise and sunset hours.

Domesticated turkeys consume a commercially produced feed formulated to increase the size of the turkeys. To supplement their nutrition, farmers will also feed them grains wild turkeys eat such as corn.

Grooming 
Turkeys participate in a number of grooming behaviors including: dusting, sunning, and feather preening. In dusting, turkeys get low on their stomach or side and flap their wings, coating themselves with dirt. This action serves to remove debris build-up on the feathers and also clog tiny pores that parasites such as lice can inhabit. Sunning for turkeys involves bathing in the sunlight, for their top and bottom halves. This can serve to liquidate the oil that turkeys naturally produce, spreading over their feathers and dry their feathers from precipitation at the same time. In feather preening, turkeys are able to remove dirt and bacteria, while also ensuring that non-durable feathers are removed.

Flight 
Though domestic turkeys are considered flightless, wild turkeys can and do fly for short distances.  Turkeys are best adapted for walking and foraging; they do not fly as a normal means of travel.  When faced with a perceived danger, wild turkeys can fly up to a quarter mile.  Turkeys may also make short flights to assist roosting in a tree.

Use by humans

The species Meleagris gallopavo is eaten by humans. They were first domesticated by the indigenous people of Mexico from at least 800 BC onwards. By 200 BC, the indigenous people of what is today the American Southwest had domesticated turkeys; though the theory that they were introduced from Mexico was once influential, modern studies suggest that the turkeys of the Southwest were domesticated independently from those in Mexico. Turkeys were used both as a food source and for their feathers and bones, which were used in both practical and cultural contexts. Compared to wild turkeys, domestic turkeys are selectively bred to grow larger in size for their meat.

Turkey forms a central part of modern Thanksgiving celebrations in the United States of America, and is often eaten at similar holiday occasions, such as Christmas.

The Norfolk turkeys
In her memoirs, Lady Dorothy Nevill (1826–1913) recalls that her great-grandfather Horatio Walpole, 1st Earl of Orford (1723–1809), imported a quantity of American turkeys which were kept in the woods around Wolterton Hall and in all probability were the embryo flock for the popular Norfolk turkey breeds of today.

Gallery

References

External links

Birds described in 1758
Extant Miocene first appearances
Game birds
Meleagris
Taxa named by Carl Linnaeus